Przechlewo is a former PKP railway station in Przechlewo (Pomeranian Voivodeship), Poland.

References 
Przechlewo article at Polish Stations Database, URL accessed at 7 March 2006

Railway stations in Pomeranian Voivodeship
Disused railway stations in Pomeranian Voivodeship
Człuchów County